Christian "Kiki" Neiva Afonso (born 10 December 1994) is a Portuguese professional footballer who plays for F.C. Vizela as a left-back.

Club career
Born in the Vila Chã municipality of Esposende, Afonso finished his development at Rio Ave FC. He made his senior debut on 11 May 2013, coming on as a last-minute substitute in a 2–1 home win against Gil Vicente F.C. in the Primeira Liga.

Afonso went back to Portugal following a brief spell in England with Dagenham & Redbridge, going on spend four seasons in the Segunda Liga with Atlético Clube de Portugal, Gil Vicente and S.C. Olhanense. He scored his first goal as a professional on 18 January 2015, helping the first of those teams defeat the last 3–2.

Afonso returned to the top division in the summer of 2017, but totalled just six league appearances over two seasons for C.D. Feirense and Belenenses SAD. The former club also loaned him to third-tier side F.C. Felgueiras 1932.

On 14 August 2019, Afonso signed with F.C. Vizela. He was part of the squads that earned two promotions in as many years to return to the top tier, contributing 32 matches (33 in all competitions) and two goals in the 2020–21 campaign.

International career
Afonso was part of the Portugal under-20 squad at the 2014 Toulon Tournament, playing the entire 4–1 victory over China in the group stage in an eventual third-place finish.

References

External links

Portuguese League profile 

1994 births
Living people
People from Esposende
Sportspeople from Braga District
Portuguese footballers
Association football defenders
Primeira Liga players
Liga Portugal 2 players
Campeonato de Portugal (league) players
Padroense F.C. players
Rio Ave F.C. players
Atlético Clube de Portugal players
Gil Vicente F.C. players
S.C. Olhanense players
C.D. Feirense players
F.C. Felgueiras 1932 players
Belenenses SAD players
F.C. Vizela players
Dagenham & Redbridge F.C. players
Portugal youth international footballers
Portuguese expatriate footballers
Expatriate footballers in England
Portuguese expatriate sportspeople in England